Maya Maschindra is a 1975 Indian Telugu-language Hindu mythological film, produced by Pinjala Subba Rao under the P.S.R. Pictures banner and directed by Babu Bhai Mistry. It stars N. T. Rama Rao, Vanisri and music composed by Satyam.

Plot
The film begins with Kshira Sagara Madanam where gods & demons churn the ocean for Amrutham the nectar when Lord Vishnu as Jagan Mohini the enchantress lures the demons and hands them over to the Gods. Lord Siva is cognizant of it via Sage Narada and heckles. Moreover, he states that be no one in the universe to delude him as he is anti to lust. At the mention of it, Vishnu again arrives as Mohini, when Siva is fervor for her beauty. Whereat, Vishnu mocks Siva and he taunts Vishnu to teach him a lesson. Parallelly, Goddess Lakshmi also conflicts with her husband regarding the superiority of men & women. To sort it out Vishnu lays hold of an avatar of sage Maya Machindra and preaches recite to get salvation. On the provocation of Narada, Lord Hanuman battles with Machindra when he bows his head down detecting him as his Lord. As of now, Siva appears Gorakh who becomes a disciple of Machindra. Plus, Lakshmi as a queen Tilottama Devi a men hater and establishes a kingdom. 

Listening to it, Machindra encounters her when she is defeated. So, she turns into his devotee, knits him and they are blessed with a baby boy Meenanatha. Knowing it, Gorak decides to divert his mentor's mind back to spirituality. Anyhow, Tilottama impedes his attempts but to avail. However, Gorak triumphs in retrieving his mentor when Meenanatha's attachment drags him back. Hence, Gorak gets Meenanatha bitten by a snake. Here, Machindra breaks down to make the boy live. Thereupon, Gorak conceitedly divulges that he lost his powers due to human ties. Then Machindra asks him to try, but he too fails. Disheartened, Gorak immolates himself, Hanuman brings out his ashes and requests Machindra to make Gorak alive when his attempt with a true heart flourishes. Currently, Gorak questions why he is unable to make Meenanatha alive. At that point, Hanuman enlightens him that his entire power is devoted to his mentor which is forgotten by his loftiness. Ergo, Gorak sustains his devotion to his mentor and makes Meenanatha alive. Finally, all of them back to Vaikuntam where Vishnu proclaims that the male & female are equal in creation, and humans must be spared from illusion.

Cast
N. T. Rama Rao as Lord Vishnu / Maya Machhindra  
Vanisri as Goddess Lakshmi / Tilottama Devi 
Ramakrishna as  Lord Siva / Ghoraknath
Kanta Rao as Narada Maharshi
K. V. Chalam as Vaidyanath
Arjan Janardana Rao as  God Hanuman
P. J. Sarma
Kanchana as Jagan Mohini 
P. R. Varalakshmi 
Dhanasri as Kaalindi
Anitha as Goddess Parvathi

Soundtrack

Music composed by  Satyam. Music released by AVM Audio Company.

References

External links
 

Hindu mythological films
Films directed by Babubhai Mistry
Films scored by Satyam (composer)